Natasha Claudine Garcia Alquiros is a Filipina international footballer who plays as a midfielder. She has been playing for the national team of the Philippines since 2007. Alquiros has played for women's team of Green Archers United at the club level. She also works as a host at TV5.

In 2016, Alquiros joined Hiraya F.C. which participated in the inaugural season of the PFF Women's League.

Career statistics

International goals
Scores and results list the Philippines' goal tally first.

References

1991 births
Living people
De La Salle University alumni
Filipino women's footballers
Philippines women's international footballers
Women's association football midfielders